Deep Run is a tributary of Godbolt Creek in Baldwin County, Alabama in the United States. The GNIS I.D. number is 117191.

References

Rivers of Alabama
Rivers of Baldwin County, Alabama